Jana Novotná and Helena Suková successfully defended their title by defeating Hana Mandlíková and Pam Shriver 6–3, 6–1 in the final.

Seeds
The first four seeds seeds received a bye into the second round.

Draw

Finals

Top half

Bottom half

References

External links
 Official results archive (ITF)
 Official results archive (WTA)

1990 Doubles
1990 WTA Tour
1990 in Australian tennis